The Freifjord Tunnel is a  long undersea tunnel under the Freifjorden in Møre og Romsdal county, Norway. The tunnel is part of the Norwegian National Road 70. The tunnel opened in 1992 as part of the Krifast system which connects the city of Kristiansund to the mainland of Norway through this tunnel and then across either the Bergsøysund Bridge or the Gjemnessund Bridge from Bergsøya.

References

Buildings and structures in Kristiansund
Gjemnes
Road tunnels in Møre og Romsdal
Subsea tunnels in Norway
1992 establishments in Norway
Norwegian National Road 70
Tunnels completed in 1992